Tuoyema Township (Mandarin: 托叶玛乡) is a township in central Henan Mongol Autonomous County, Huangnan Tibetan Autonomous Prefecture, Qinghai, China, 22 kilometres away from the county seat. Tuoyema has 6 villages under its township-level jurisdiction:

 Ningsai Village
 Quhai Village
 Qulong Village
 Tuoyema Village
 Wenqun Village
 Xiawute Village

Tuoyema's total population is 3,000 and 99.8% of Tuoyema Township's population is of Mongolian descent.

References 

Township-level divisions of Qinghai
Huangnan Tibetan Autonomous Prefecture